Amtocephale (meaning "Amtgai head") is a genus of pachycephalosaurid dinosaur from early Late Cretaceous (Turonian-Santonian stages) deposits of southern Gobi Desert, Mongolia.

Amtocephale is known from the holotype MPC-D 100/1203, a nearly complete frontoparietal dome of a subadult individual. It was collected from the Baynshire Formation at the Amtgai locality. Amtocephale was first named by Mahito Watabe, Khishigjaw Tsogtbaatar and Robert M. Sullivan in 2011 and the type species is Amtocephale gobiensis. The generic name combines a reference to the Amtgai site with a Greek κεφαλή, kephale, "head". The specific name refers to the provenance from the Gobi.

The contribution to the dome length of the parietal part is exceptionally large, with a portion of 41%.

Amtocephale was assigned to the Pachycephalosauridae and is perhaps the oldest pachycephalosaurid known, depending on the exact age of the formation.

See also

 Timeline of pachycephalosaur research

References

Late Cretaceous dinosaurs of Asia
Pachycephalosaurs
Gobi Desert
Fossils of Mongolia
Fossil taxa described in 2011
Ornithischian genera